Albert Hare (12 May 1887 – 23 December 1969) was a British track and field athlete who competed in the 1912 Summer Olympics in Stockholm, Sweden.

In 1912 he was eliminated in the first round of the 1500 metres competition. He was born in New Cross, London and died in Bexhill-on-Sea.

References

External links
Profile at olympics.org.uk

1887 births
1969 deaths
English male middle-distance runners
Olympic athletes of Great Britain
Athletes (track and field) at the 1912 Summer Olympics
People from New Cross
Athletes from London